Dahe Township is a township of Sunan Yugur Autonomous County, Zhangye, Gansu, China. Dahe Township is located within the Heihe river basin, in the Qilian Mountains, along Gansu Provincial Highway 220. Most of the township consists of grassland, which is home to around 100 red deer that eat the township's gojis in the midsummer. The township is home to large Yugur population, which comprises about 46% of its population, and is also home to over 200 Tibetans. The township is home to the Ba'ersi Sheng Mountain Scenic area. Animal husbandry comprises a large portion of the township's economy, and sheep herding in particular plays a prominent role in the local economy.

History 
In 2019, archeologists found a number of rock paintings, many depicting deer, which may date back to approximately 1500 BCE.

Geography 
Much of Dahe Township's area is grassland, however, there is a significant amount of forests in the township.

Major mountains in the township include Yumu Mountain, Heishan Peak, Jiudungou Ridge, Da Mountain, Binggou Peak, Shijuligou Head, Hongshizuizhong Ridge, and Xihong Geda.

Major rivers that flow through Dahe Township include Longchang River, Da River, Bailang River, Shuiguan River, Xi River, Shihuiguan River, and Maying River.

Flora and fauna 
Wild animals native to the township include Thorold's deer, water deer, wild ox, argali, sheep, bears, panthers, wolves, lynx, snowcocks, and the blue eared pheasant. Plants native to the township include Saussurea involucrata, rhubarb, Hansenia weberbaueriana (syn. Many plants found native to the area are used in Traditional Chinese Medicine. Dahe Township also has an abundance of mushrooms and fat choy.

Climate 

Administrative divisions 
Dahe Township has jurisdiction over the following 18 villages:

 Guanghua
 Datan
 Hongwan
 Dongling
 Xiling
 Xichache
 Xihe
 Yingpan
 Tianqiaowan
 Songmutan
 Laohugou
 Dacha
 Baizhuangzi
 Lamawan
Xiliugou
 Jiusiwan
 Hongbianzi
Jinchanghe

Demographics

Ethnic groups 
Dahe Township is a majority minority area, with the largest pluralities being the township's Han Chinese and Yugur populations, which both comprise about 46% of the township's population. Besides these two groups, there is also a sizable Tibetan population, as well as smaller amounts of Hui, Monguor, Mongol, and Miao peoples.

Previous figures have put the Yugur population in Dahe Township at about 3,000 people, and noted its spread across numerous villages within the township. The Yugurs of Dahe Township speak a Turkic language, as opposed to many Yugurs to its east, who speak a Mongolic language. Yugurs in Dahe Township belong to the Mountain Yugur, or taglıg, subgroup.

Income 
The county's per capita disposable income totaled 20,129.98 renminbi in 2020, a 6.3% increase from 2019.

In the early 1980s the township's average income demographics were studied closely for a book named Village, Market and Well-being.

Economy 
Animal husbandry is a major portion of the township's economy, producing 49.64 million renminbi (RMB) worth of income in 2017. Sheep raising in particular is a major component of Dahe Township's economy, employing many. The town has a veterinary station to aid local herders. Dahe Township has a water conservation program to provide local herders with water.

Agriculture represents a much smaller, although still significant, portion of Dahe Township's economy, generating 5.21 million in income in 2017. Walnuts are also grown in the area.

Dahe Township also has a variety of mineral deposits, including coal, jade, serpentinite, copper, gold, gypsum, and limestone. However, Dahe is disputed mining site.

Education 
Dahe has one primary school in the center of its administrative boundaries.

Culture 
Yugur shamanism was practiced in the township until 1977, when the region's last shaman died.

References 

Populated places in China
Township-level divisions of Gansu